Repack may refer to:

RePack, a packaging service
Repacking, part of the process of Spectrum reallocation in the United States